Philenora chionastis is a moth in the subfamily Arctiinae. It was described by Edward Meyrick in 1886. It is found in the Australian states of Queensland and New South Wales.

References

Moths described in 1886
Lithosiini